Cô nàng bất đắc dĩ (Unavoidable Girl) is a Vietnamese television series, shown first on VTV3 channel. This movie bought the rights from the film adaptation of Argentina - Lalola.

Vietnamese telenovelas
2000s Vietnamese television series
2009 Vietnamese television series debuts